Chenar-e Mahmudi (also Romanized as Chenār-e Maḩmūdī; also known as Chenār and Deh Chenār-e Maḩmūdī) is a village in Rig Rural District, in the Central District of Lordegan County, Chaharmahal and Bakhtiari Province, Iran. At the 2006 census, its population was 1,329, in 263 families. The village is populated by Lurs.

References 

Populated places in Lordegan County
Luri settlements in Chaharmahal and Bakhtiari Province